Neurochemical Research is a monthly peer-reviewed scientific journal covering neurochemistry. It was established in 1976 and is published by Springer Science+Business Media. The editor-in-chief is Arne Schousboe (University of Copenhagen).

Abstracting and indexing 
The journal is abstracted and indexed in:

According to the Journal Citation Reports, the journal has a 2012 impact factor of 2.125.

References

External links 
 

Neurochemistry
Springer Science+Business Media academic journals
Publications established in 1976
Neuroscience journals
Monthly journals
English-language journals